Advmaker is an affiliate program of Internet advertising in Runet, which has about 17,000 advertising spaces, covering more than 100 million visitors, which are three billion page views per month. It is intended for webmasters and site owners who wish to place advertising on their web projects, and advertisers.

History 
The advertising network Advmaker was founded in April 2008, and a year later it hit the top 50 sites in Russia (23rd place), Ukraine (28th place), Belarus (32nd) and Kazakhstan (25th place). In 2010, according to a published «Google» ranking, the company entered the top 1000 sites worldwide. In 2014, the company takes part in the ranking of the second annual award RACE Awards 2014 in the category «breakthrough of the year in the lead generation market» and in October the 3rd -4th, is a Wi-Fi sponsor of the marketing and affiliate programs exhibition Russian Affiliate Congress & Expo (RACE ). 

In 2015, the company according to the results of the analytical research project Ruward: Track ranked first among the eight major players in the Russian Internet banner networks: Advmaker, Kadam, ADSkape, Post Banners, Propellers Ads, AdForse, Traffic.ru.

Requirements for webmasters 
Before putting on the Internet all the websites are moderated. Website owners who are members of Advmaker, earn an income for clicks or impressions, payments are made once a month. Any site may enter the advertising network, which does not violate the laws of any country, with the Russian speaking audience, satisfying the rules of participation (at least 500 hosts per day, there must be more than 3 visits per person, the ratio of RU-traffic is more than 50% to the rest). An additional point is that a website, created on a free hosting Narod.ru and others, for example Ucoz may become a member of Advmaker, there are also a referral system in the ad network and scheduled payments are made twice a month.

Requirements for advertisers 
Minimal advertising budget should be five thousand rubles, the website should not contain pop-under (click-under) ads, erotic materials, viruses or other malicious scripts, the content must be unique and the site cannot be on a free hosting service.

Types of advertising 
 Clickunder
 Slide banners
 Web banner
 Top Scroll
 Preloader banners
 Video banners
 Mobile redirect
 Branding

Clients 
Such large companies as Yandex, mail.ru, Google, Lingualeo, Svyaznoy, MeGoGo etc. cooperate with advertising network Advmaker. Also the company has been bootstrapping online games more than 6 years, among which are Wargaming, Panzar, Zzima.com, Bigpoint, Nival, Gaijin Entertainment and others. According to the statistics Advmaker during 2013 for 20 of its largest customers attracted 4,217,515 players, and in 2014 it is planned to attract more than six million ones. The company covers approximately 10% of online gaming market in Russia.

References

External links
Official Homepage 
Official Page in Estonia 
How To Start Making Money Online With Google AdSense

Online marketplaces of Russia
Online advertising services and affiliate networks